Dalrympelea is a genus of flowering plants belonging to the family Staphyleaceae.

Its native range is Tropical Asia.

The genus is named in honour of Alexander Dalrymple (1737–1808), a Scottish geographer. and was published in first published in Pl. Coromandel Vol.3 on page 76 in 1820.

Species known:

Dalrympelea borneensis 
Dalrympelea calciphila 
Dalrympelea grandis 
Dalrympelea nitida 
Dalrympelea pomifera 
Dalrympelea sphaerocarpa 
Dalrympelea stipulacea 
Dalrympelea trifoliata

References

Staphyleaceae
Rosid genera
Plants described in 1820